This is a list of cricket players who have played representative cricket for Sri Lanka Schools XI in Sri Lanka.

It includes players that have played at least one match, in senior First-Class, List A cricket, or Twenty20 matches. Practice matches are not included, unless they have officially been classified at First-class tour matches.

The Inter-Provincial Cricket Tournament is the premier domestic cricket competition in Sri Lanka. It was founded in 1990.

First Class Players
All of the Players who have represented Sri Lanka Schools XI in First-Class matches:

List 'A' Players
Sri Lanka Schools XI is yet to play any List A cricket matches.

Twenty20 Players
All of the Players who have represented Sri Lanka Schools XI in Twenty20 domestic competitions:

External links
Players Who Have Played For Sri Lanka Schools XI
Sri Lanka Cricket

Sri Lanka Schools XI